Following the September 11 attacks in 2001, Clear Channel Communications (now iHeartMedia), the largest owner of radio stations in the United States, circulated an internal memorandum containing a list of songs that program directors felt were "lyrically questionable" to play in the aftermath of the attacks.

During the time immediately after the attacks, many television and radio stations altered normal programming in response to the events, and the rumour spread that Clear Channel and its subsidiaries had established a list of songs with lyrics Clear Channel deemed "questionable". The list was not an explicit demand not to play the songs listed, but rather a suggestion that they "might not want to play these songs". The list was made public by the independent radio industry newsletter Hits Daily Double, which was not affiliated with iHeartMedia. Snopes.com did research on the subject and concluded that the list did exist as a suggestion for radio stations but noted that it was not an outright ban on the songs in question. The compiled list was the subject of media attention around the time of its release.

The list contains 165 suggestions, including a single suggestion for each song in Rage Against the Machine's entire catalogue at the time (49 songs) and covers of certain songs (such as Bob Dylan's "Knockin' on Heaven's Door" and the cover by Guns N' Roses). In some cases, only certain covers were included on the list: for example, the cover of "Smooth Criminal" by Alien Ant Farm is on the list while the original Michael Jackson recording is not; similarly, Martha and the Vandellas's original version of "Dancing in the Street" and Van Halen's cover are included, but David Bowie and Mick Jagger's cover is not.

Reasons for inclusions
The Clear Channel memorandum contains songs that, in their titles or lyrics, vaguely refer to open subjects intertwined with the September 11 attacks, such as airplanes, collisions, death, conflict, violence, explosions, the month of September, and New York City, as well as general concepts that could be connected to aspects of the attacks, such as the sky, falling, and weapons. Also included under the ban were several happy and celebratory songs (famously including Louis Armstrong's "What a Wonderful World"), as Clear Channel believed playing joyful music in the aftermath of the attacks was inappropriate.

WASH, a Clear Channel-owned station in Washington, D.C., reportedly played Kool & the Gang's "Celebration" while the memorandum was being circulated, "which brought a polite if reproachful call from one listener, who was assured by the station the song's broadcast was a mistake."

List of songs

While not listed in the memorandum, Cold's "Bleed" was similarly retitled (to "Thirteen") around this same time.

See also 
List of songs about the September 11 attacks
List of songs banned by the BBC
Music censorship

References

Further reading

External links
Clear Channel memorandum playlist on YouTube (up to 202 videos available)

2001 documents
2001 in American music
2001-related lists
2001 in radio
2001 controversies in the United States
Aftermath of the September 11 attacks
Censorship of broadcasting in the United States
Censorship of music
IHeartMedia
Lists of songs
Mass media-related controversies in the United States

Memoranda
Self-censorship